Meet the Flower Kings is the second live album by the progressive rock band The Flower Kings. It was released in 2003 as a double-CD, and also as a two-disc DVD concert video. A limited release book-case version of this includes both the 2-CD and 2-DVD sets together, along with a booklet.

The show was recorded at the Stadsteater in Uppsala, Sweden, on February 10, 2003.


Track listing
All songs by Roine Stolt except where noted.

CD version

Disc One

Disc Two

DVD version

Disc One
 The Truth Will Set You Free
 On Tour in USA
 Garden of Dreams, Part 1
 On Tour in Europe
 Garden of Dreams, Part 2
 Setting Up for the DVD

Disc Two
 Humanizzimo
 Oddballs of Rehearsing
 Circus Brimstone
 In Recording Studio 2002
 Silent Inferno
 On Tour in South America 2001
 Stardust We Are

Personnel
Roine Stolt - guitar, vocals
Tomas Bodin - keyboard
Hasse Fröberg - guitar, vocals
Daniel Gildenlöw - guitar, backing vocals, keyboard, percussion
Hasse Brunisson - percussion, voice
Jonas Reingold - bass guitar, bass pedals
Zoltan Czörsz - drums
Pontus Eklund - dancer, juggler, flamethrower
Hea Ekstam-Bruniusson - dancer

References

External links
 

The Flower Kings albums
2003 live albums
Inside Out Music live albums
Inside Out Music video albums